Harpalus tangutorum is a species of ground beetle in the subfamily Harpalinae. It was described by Kataev in 1993.

References

tangutorum
Beetles described in 1993